Alan Taylor (born 11 December 1950) is a Canadian volleyball player. He competed in the men's tournament at the 1976 Summer Olympics.

References

External links
 

1950 births
Living people
Canadian men's volleyball players
Olympic volleyball players of Canada
Volleyball players at the 1976 Summer Olympics
Sportspeople from Alberta
Pan American Games medalists in volleyball
Pan American Games bronze medalists for Canada
Medalists at the 1979 Pan American Games